Connect Airlines is a proposed American airline that intends to operate flights between Billy Bishop Toronto City Airport and Midwest and Northeast US cities. Proposed service will fly between Toronto to/from Chicago and Philadelphia. The airline would be backed by Waltzing Matilda Aviation, a Massachusetts-based charter operator. The company intends to lease De Havilland Canada Dash 8 turboprop aircraft formerly operated by Flybe and will target primarily business travel.

In June 2022, Connect Airlines announced an order for 75 converted ATR 72-600 turboprops, with an option for an additional 25, to be converted by Universal Hydrogen to use hydrogen powertrains.

Connect Airlines received a certificate of convenience and necessity for domestic air transportation from the US Department of Transportation (DOT) in July 2022 and a certificate for foreign transport in September 2022. The airline had acquired two Dash-8s as of September 2022, with further aircraft expected to arrive monthly until February 2023. The aircraft have had one row of seats removed and will feature 26 premium seats with increased legroom, as well as 48 economy seats. Service is due to be launched in November 2022; an interline agreement with an as-yet unnamed major carrier has been signed.

As of December 2022, the airline is still running proving flights to complete its application requirements for its air operator's certificate. The airline is looking to hire direct-entry captains to run its initial flights.

References 

Airlines of Canada
Airlines established in 2021
2021 establishments in Canada